The Terra Sancta Museum is a museum run by the Catholic Church Custody of the Holy Land, in the Old City of Jerusalem.  First opened in 1902, then reopened in March 2016, the museum exhibits ancient artifacts, items and structures (fishing hooks, slingshot, spearheads, cisterns, seeds, hairpins, mirror, make-up spatula sets, tableware, work tools, ancient coins, coin casting molds, playing dice ceramic fragments, ossuaries stone slabs, and burial tombs) that existed at the time of Jesus.

Location 
The Terra Sancta Museum is located in Old City, divided between two Catholic convents: part of the collections are in the compound housing the Church of the Flagellation, in the Via Dolorosa, where Jesus was according to tradition flogged by Roman soldiers, after he was sentenced to death by Pontius Pilate; and another part is at the Monastery of Saint Saviour, also in the Old City of Jerusalem.

Background 
The museum is a result of archaeological discoveries and excavations made throughout Israel, Lebanon, Cyprus, Palestinian territories, Egypt and Jordan over the 20th century by the Franciscan Order. These excavations produced tens of thousands of artefacts which were stored in the Studium Biblicum Franciscanum for years before being moved to the museum.

References 

Museums in Jerusalem
Museums in the State of Palestine